RS Americas, Inc (formerly Allied Electronics & Automation) is a United States based omni-channel provider of product and service solutions for designers, builders and maintainers of industrial equipment and operations. They are part of London based RS Group, plc (formerly Electrocomponents, plc), a FTSE 100 global leader in the omni-channel distribution of products and services for industrial equipment and operations.

History 
The Americas division of RS Group was founded in 1928 in Chicago, Illinois by Simon "Sy" Wexler as Allied Radio, the radio parts distribution arm of Columbia Radio Corporation (also founded by Wexler in 1921). Allied distributed radio sets, tubes, capacitors, amateur radio equipment, citizens band radios, communications equipment, electronic kits and consumer audio systems through retail and mail order.

In 1970, the Tandy Corporation, Radio Shack's former parent company, purchased Allied Radio, the consumer division, along with Allied Electronics, the industrial division. Over the years, Allied Radio was folded into Radio Shack and Allied Electronics focused on distribution of electronic components to electronics engineers. 

In 1999, Allied became the North American division of Electrocomponents. In 2016, Allied expanded into South America with a full-service office in Santiago, Chile, and in 2017, grew their sales presence in Mexico. In October 2022, Allied announced they would be changing their name to RS in Q1 2023 as part of an overall rebranding strategy to establish a better connection across RS Group’s products and services. On February 6, 2023, the name change became official.

Operations 
RS Americas, Inc is headquartered in Fort Worth, Texas. It has a 560,000 square foot distribution facility and a 57,000 square foot hybrid model corporate office. In addition to their headquarters, they have a local presence in more than 60 of the largest markets across the US, Canada, Mexico, and Chile.The management team of eleven Vice Presidents and Chief Officers is led by Interim President Doug Moody.

In July 2022, RS was named one of the 50 Most Inspiring Workplaces in North America, and in November 2022, received accolades by the Dallas Morning News as one of the Top Places to Work.

Products & Services 
The Americas division of RS Group supplies over 3.5 million products for purchase online from more than 650 suppliers in categories extending from automation and control equipment to interconnect, passive, active, and electromechanical components. They are members of the National Association of Electrical Distributors (NAED), the Power Transmission Distributors Association (PTDA), and the National Association of Wholesaler-Distributors (NAW). Additionally, they offer a comprehensive suite of services and tools including the industry's largest collection of 360 degree product images, an extensive range of 3D CAD models, more than 1.1 million datasheets, an experienced technical support team, plus kitting, bagging, and labeling services. The company also publishes their Expert Advice series of articles and podcasts designed to provide in-depth industry knowledge that helps customers identify product and technology solutions for their businesses.

References

External list
RS Americas website
RS Group homepage

Companies based in Fort Worth, Texas
Electronics companies of the United States
Electronic component distributors
1999 mergers and acquisitions
Radio manufacturers